Operation Sankat Mochan (Nepali: संकट मोचन, Operation Crisis Relief) is a Nepal Army earthquake relief operation following the April 2015 Nepal earthquake; the Nepal Army has deployed 90 percent of its force.

Operation
Nepal army took three phase operation initiative.
Phase 1: Immediate response
Phase 2: Coordinating Rescue and Relief
Phase 3: Current Recovery operations

Interagency collaboration
Hundreds of army personnel from different countries and 17,000 Armed Police Force officials support the Nepal Army. Countries include India, China, Pakistan, Sri Lanka, Turkey, Bangladesh, Israel, Netherlands, Bhutan, Poland, USA, Canada, Japan, Malaysia, France, Spain, South Korea, Singapore, Thailand, Belgium, Russia, Norway, UK, Switzerland, Germany and UAE. India leads the countries in personnel with 962.

References

See also
May 2015 Nepal earthquake
Humanitarian response to the 2015 Nepal earthquake
Nepalese Army
Operation Maitri, the Indian Armed Forces earthquake relief operation 
Operation Sahayogi Haat

2015 Nepal earthquakes

Non-combat military operations involving Nepal
Humanitarian military operations
Modi administration